Time's Encomium (Jan. 1968-Jan. 1969, 31'43") is an electronic, four channel, musical composition by Charles Wuorinen for synthesized and processed synthesized sound. Released on Nonesuch Records in 1969, the composition was commissioned by Teresa Sterne for the label.

It was awarded the 1970 Pulitzer Prize for Music, and was realized on the RCA Mark II Synthesizer at the Columbia-Princeton Electronic Music Center, NYC. At the time Wuorinen was the youngest composer ever to win the Pulitzer. The piece is also the first electronic piece to win the prize.

According to the composer, the primary concern of the piece appears to be rhythmic, since only pure quantitative duration, as opposed to qualitative performance variable inflection, is available to one in the electronic medium, though, "the basic materials are the twelve tempered pitch classes, and pitch-derived time relations," (due to the constraints of the synthesizer). As such, he composed, "with a view to the proportions among absolute lengths of events -- be they small (note-to-note distances) or large (overall form) -- rather than to their relative 'weights,'....conform[ing] to the basic nature of a medium in which sound is always reproduced, never performed."

However, Wuorinen rescored the piece for standard orchestra, titled Contrafactum published by C.F. Peters. The original piece was remastered and rereleased on Tzadik Records.

Sources

External links
 

Compositions by Charles Wuorinen
1969 compositions
Electronic compositions
Pulitzer Prize for Music-winning works
Serial compositions
Nonesuch Records albums